Thomas Conley was an American football player and coach of football and basketball.  Conley played college football at the University of Notre Dame from 1928 to 1930.  He was the captain of the 1930 Notre Dame Fighting Irish football team, which won a national championship. Conley was named a Second Team All-American as an end that year. He served as the head football coach at La Salle University from 1931 to 1932 and at John Carroll University from 1936 to 1942, compiling a career college football coaching record of 33–34–7.  Conley was also the head basketball coach at La Salle from 1931 to 1933 and at John Carroll from 1936 to 1943, tallying a career college basketball mark of 86–87.  He worked as an assistant football coach in charge of the ends at his alma mater, Notre Dame, from 1933 to 1935.  A native of Philadelphia, Conley attended Roman Catholic High School there.

Head coaching record

Football

Basketball

References

Year of birth missing
Year of death missing
American football ends
Basketball coaches from Pennsylvania
John Carroll Blue Streaks football coaches
John Carroll Blue Streaks men's basketball coaches
La Salle Explorers football coaches
La Salle Explorers men's basketball coaches
Notre Dame Fighting Irish football coaches
Notre Dame Fighting Irish football players
Players of American football from Philadelphia
Sportspeople from Philadelphia